Digital Nasional Berhad (DNB; English: National Digital Limited) is a Malaysian special-purpose vehicle company owned by the Ministry of Finance Malaysia and is regulated by the Malaysian Communications and Multimedia Commission. DNB was established in early March 2021 to drive the development of the 5G (fifth-generation) infrastructure in Malaysia. It will offer 5G as a wholesale network service to other telecommunication companies. 

The first rollout of the 5G services in Malaysia was launched on 15 December 2021, with TM and YTL as its operators upon rollout. 

On June 30, 2022 Communications and Multimedia Minister Annuar Musa said that the Malaysian government would announce a plan for the sale of a 70% equity stake in Digital Nasional Berhad the following week.

Deployment of 5G 
DNB had announced that it would launch and rollout the country's first 5G network with a total of 500 sites in areas within Kuala Lumpur, Putrajaya and Cyberjaya by the end of December 2021 which is expected provide about 10% population coverage. The Malaysian government had also appointed Ericsson as the sole network equipment provider at a cost of RM4 billion as well as to build the infrastructure estimated at a cost of RM11 billion.

Digital Nasional chief executive officer, Augustus Ralph Marshall, said that the country's first 5G base station installation at Bukit Tunku has been powered on which aims to deliver 500 5G-enabled sites in Kuala Lumpur, Cyberjaya and Putrajaya upon rollout.

It has also planned to deploy 5G in major cities and districts in Johor, Penang, Selangor and Sabah in 2022, with the aim of achieving 80% nationwide population coverage by the end year 2023.

Criticisms 
DNB faces criticism from a number of individuals. These individuals want the government to also allow a competing provider, if not switch to a telco alliance-based deployment model as used in Singapore, a sentiment shared by a number of telcos operating in the country. Currently only two companies- YTL's YES and TM's UniFi Mobile- have agreed to the DNB's term, while the others have publicly protested the plan. Additionally, the network will not allow all 5G phones and will only allow connection from "tested and authorized" handsets. This has raised concerns with early adopters of 5G phones as the network is as of 2022 blocking Asus, Sony, Samsung and Apple iPhone devices, but on the other hand most Chinese-made phones like Oppo, ZTE and Huawei are allowed onto the network unimpeded.

In December 2022, newly appointed Malaysian Prime Minister Anwar Ibrahim said his administration would review the plan for Digital Nasional Berhad's 5G  network introduced by his predecessor.

References

External links 
 

2021 establishments in Malaysia
Government-owned companies of Malaysia
Economy of Malaysia